The men's 3000 metres steeplechase at the 1950 European Athletics Championships was held in Brussels, Belgium, at Heysel Stadium on 27 August 1950.

Medalists

Results

Final
27 August

Participation
According to an unofficial count, 16 athletes from 11 countries participated in the event.

 (2)
 (1)
 (2)
 (2)
 (1)
 (1)
 (1)
 (2)
 (1)
 (1)
 (2)

References

3000 metres steeplechase
Steeplechase at the European Athletics Championships